Louis Yu Runchen (born December 1, 1931) is a Chinese Catholic priest and Bishop of the Roman Catholic Diocese of Hanzhong between 1986 and 2019.

Biography
Yu was born in Shaanxi in 1929. He was ordained a priest on December 8, 1957. In 1985, he was nominated by the Catholic Patriotic Association to serve as the Bishop of the Roman Catholic Diocese of Hanzhong. His episcopal ordination was held on November 30, 1986. In 1984, the Holy See appointed Bartholomew Yu Chengti as Bishop of the Roman Catholic Diocese of Hanzhong. The ordination of Bishop Louis Yu Runchen was carried out without the approval of the Holy See. Therefore, from 1986 to 2003, the Roman Catholic Diocese of Hanzhong had two main bishops at the same time. In 2003, Bishop Bartholomew Yu Chengti resigned for health reasons. Yu became the ruler of the Roman Catholic Diocese of Hanzhong. In 2004, he was elected a member of the Standing Committee of the Chinese Catholic Bishops' Conference. In 2009 after Bishop Bartholomew Yu Chengti passed away, the Holy See recognized Yu's position as Bishop of the Roman Catholic Diocese of Hanzhong. In April 2019, Stefano Xu Hongwei replaced him as new bishop of the Roman Catholic Diocese of Hanzhong. Stefano Xu Hongwei's appointment was approved by the Holy See and the Communist government.

References

1929 births
Living people
People from Shaanxi
20th-century Roman Catholic bishops in China
21st-century Roman Catholic bishops in China
Bishops of the Catholic Patriotic Association